SMS Kígyó was a torpedo boat of the Austro-Hungarian Navy (KuK). In 1910, she was renamed Torpedoboot 14.

Design and construction

The ship was built at the Yarrow shipyard in London. The torpedo boat was laid down in 1898, was launched on 11 April 1899, and commissioned on 31 January 1900.

Technical data
The ship was a small coastal torpedo boat. Her standard displacement was 115 tons, and the full displacement was 135 tons. She also held a stock of 30 tons of coal.

She was equipped with three 450 mm single torpedo tubes. The artillery armament consisted of two single 47 mm L/33 Hotchkiss on-board cannons.

Operational history
In 1910, on the basis of the ordinance on the normalization of names, Kígyó was renamed Torpedoboot 14. In 1913, she underwent a major renovation, and in 1914 she was adapted to act as a seaplane tender, one torpedo tube being removed to be replaced by a catapult. Due to the collapse of the Habsburg monarchy on 1 November 1918, the KuK flag was hoisted on the vessel for the last time. As a result of the Treaty of Trianon, the ship was awarded to Great Britain. The vessel was scrapped in 1920.

References

1899 ships
Ships built on the River Thames
Cobra-class torpedo boats